McLean Township is one of the fourteen townships of Shelby County, Ohio, United States.  The 2000 census found 3,082 people in the township, 1,738 of whom lived in the unincorporated portions of the township.

Geography
Located in the western part of the county, it borders the following townships:
Van Buren Township – northeast
Turtle Creek Township – east
Cynthian Township – south
Patterson Township, Darke County – southwest
Marion Township, Mercer County – west
Jackson Township, Auglaize County – northwest, south of German Township
German Township, Auglaize County – northwest corner, north of Jackson Township

The village of Fort Loramie is located in the center of the township. The village of Minster occupies a small tract of land in the north of the township along the county border.

Name and history
McLean Township was established in 1834. It is the only McLean Township statewide.

Government
The township is governed by a three-member board of trustees, who are elected in November of odd-numbered years to a four-year term beginning on the following January 1. Two are elected in the year after the presidential election and one is elected in the year before it. There is also an elected township fiscal officer, who serves a four-year term beginning on April 1 of the year after the election, which is held in November of the year before the presidential election. Vacancies in the fiscal officership or on the board of trustees are filled by the remaining trustees.

References

External links
County website

Townships in Shelby County, Ohio
Populated places established in 1834
1834 establishments in Ohio
Townships in Ohio